The Leica is a right tributary of the river Siret in Romania. It discharges into the Siret near Nănești.

References

External links

Rivers of Romania
Rivers of Vrancea County